Dale Alan Midkiff (born July 1, 1959) is an American actor, best known for playing Louis Creed in the horror film Pet Sematary (1989) and Captain Darien Lambert in the TV series Time Trax.

Career

Midkiff acted in off-Broadway plays like Mark Medoff's The Wager. His first movie role was in Roger Corman's Streetwalkin' playing a pimp named Duke. Dale's acting was called "grittily impressive" in what some consider a B-movie classic. He has said in interviews that while his family never quite understood his interest in acting, they never discouraged him: "I love them for allowing a kid to believe in his dreams."

His first major break came when he landed the role of the young  Jock Ewing in Dallas: The Early Years. That was followed by what many consider his biggest role to date, Elvis Presley, in the four-hour miniseries, Elvis and Me, and by Dream Street, a short-lived "blue collar" series set in New Jersey. Midkiff's roles have run the gamut from the wife beater in A Cry For Help: The Tracey Thurman Story, to the "good old boy" cop who discovers his partner/best friend is a murderer in Vigilante Cop, to the heroic time-traveling fugitive retrieval cop in Time Trax, to the amiable ladies' man and town protector in The Magnificent Seven.  He is also well known for having played the lead role of Louis Creed in the 1989 film version of Stephen King's Pet Sematary.

Filmography

Video games

References

External links

1959 births
American male film actors
American male musical theatre actors
American male television actors
Living people
Male actors from Maryland
20th-century American male actors